Pterotus obscuripennis, commonly known as the Douglas Fir Glowworm, is a species of firefly in the beetle family Lampyridae. It is found in North America. Adult males are smaller (9.5-12 mm), alate, capable of fight, have an elaborate antenna morphology, and are totally non-luminous. Adult females are larger (~25-35 mm), fully larviform and flightless, and cream to light golden brown in color, and luminous with photo organs on the seventh and eighth abdominal segment. Larvae are largely black in color, with cream to white coloration in the spaces between the body segments, and are luminous and predatory on slugs.

References

Further reading

 
 

Lampyridae
Articles created by Qbugbot
Beetles described in 1859